Neelan is a name.

People with it as a given name 

 Neelan Tiruchelvam (1944–1999), Sri Lankan Tamil lawyer, academic, politician

People with it as a surname

Fictional characters 
From the British soap-opera Coronation Street

 Kelly Neelan
 Laura Neelan
 Rick Neelan

See also 

 Elan (disambiguation)
 Neel (disambiguation)

Indian masculine given names